Yale is a ghost town in Itawamba County, Mississippi, United States.

Yale was located five miles north of Tremont and one mile west of State Highway 23N.

The population was 21 in 1900.

A post office operated under the name Yale from 1891 to 1907.

A private academy, the Oakland Normal Institute, was located at Yale and provided a classical education in art and Latin, as well as education and business courses.  The school was established in 1887, and remained open until 1904, when it became a county school.

References

Former populated places in Mississippi
Former populated places in Itawamba County, Mississippi